Keith Wayne Shepherd (born January 21, 1968) is an American former baseball middle relief pitcher. Shepherd played in Major League Baseball (MLB) from  through  for the Philadelphia Phillies (1992), Colorado Rockies (1993), Boston Red Sox (1995) and Baltimore Orioles (1996). Listed at 6' 2", 205 lb., Shepherd batted and threw right-handed.

Career
Shepherd was selected by the Pittsburgh Pirates in the 1986 MLB draft.

Shepherd pitched for nine different MLB organizations from 1986 to 1997, including parts of four seasons in the MLB. He posted a 2–5 record with a 6.71 earned run average and three saves in 41 appearances for the Phillies, Rockies, Red Sox and Orioles. In 185 minor league appearances, he went 19–31 with 4.97 ERA and 32 saves. Keith Shepherd has pitched since 1998 for various teams in the Fort Wayne, Indiana 18 and over league. He also served as the assistant baseball coach under Justin Denney at Wabash High School.
 
Shepherd also pitched in the Brother Elephants of the Chinese Professional Baseball League (CPBL).

Personal Issues
Keith was involved in a shooting that occurred in the City of Wabash on December 23, 2016. Wabash Police identified the victim of the shooting as Keith W. Shepherd, 48, Wabash. Wabash Police alleged at the time that the suspect in the shooting was Christina M. Bowman, 50, Wabash.

He had surgery for a shot to the head and survived. The alleged attacker and ex-girlfriend, Christina Bowman, cut or stabbed herself after the shooting and after driving back to her home. She survived and was prosecuted in Wabash County, Indiana. 

During the Court Process it was revealed that she did, in fact, walk into his house on Allen Street in Wabash Indiana and quickly shot him in the face with a .380 Caliber Handgun that she had purchased just 8 days prior. She immediately fled the scene and was later captured by local Police at her resident on Sunset Drive where she was attempting to harm and or kill herself. She was later tried for Attempted murder and was found Guilty and Sentenced to 25 Years in Indiana Department of Corrections with 5 years suspended on Probatio, Bringing her likely Release Date in around 13 years time. Wabash County Prosecutor William C. Hartley Jr. represented the State of Indiana and the Defendant was represented by Attorney Mark Small of Indianapolis.

After the Conviction of Bowman Keith filed suit against Bowman and Dunham’s Athleisure Corp., alleging that the store was negligent in the sale. In September 2018, Dunham’s filed a request for summary judgment against Shepherd and a Wabash County Superior Court judge denied Dunham’s request. That decision was reversed Wednesday by the Indiana Court of Appeals. The court said Dunham’s is immune for liability and the court erred when it denied summary judgment for the store. There are still questions whether the sale to Bowman was lawful.

However, the appellate court referred to previous state rulings in which a shooting victim cannot rely on the harm caused by the misuse of a firearm, even if sold unlawfully, in order to sue the seller.

In an earlier filing by Bowman’s attorney, Emily Guenin-Hodson, wrote, “This is not a case about the 2nd Amendment. It is not a case involving the creation of new gun laws. This is a case about holding a gun dealer responsible for following federal and state regulations imposed on the commercial sale of arms.”

In another filing, Dunham’s attorney, Robert Ahlgrim, wrote, “Dunham’s employee did not have actual of knowledge that Bowman intended to commit a crime. The undisputed facts reveal that Bowman told the Dunham’s employee she wanted the firearm for her personal protection.

According to Court Documents in the fall of 2016, Keith Shepherd and his girlfriend, Christina Bowman, went to a Dunham’s sports store in Wabash. She asked him to buy her a gun. He refused, and the couple argued.

Shepherd told the clerk at the gun counter: “Whatever you do, don’t ever sell that little girl a gun. She’s dangerous. She would shoot me.”

Shepherd didn’t leave Bowman’s name with the clerk.

On Dec. 15, Bowman went back to Dunham’s and bought a gun. She was cleared in a background check, although Shepherd would later claim the paperwork wasn’t completed properly.

This was finalized and closed in May 2019 but Keith has been quoted as saying he Plans to continue to recover damages caused by Bowman and the Negligence of Dunhams.

References

External links
, or CPBL
Retrosheet

1968 births
Living people
American expatriate baseball players in Canada
American expatriate baseball players in Taiwan
Augusta Pirates players
Baltimore Orioles players
Baseball City Royals players
Baseball players from Indiana
Birmingham Barons players
Boston Red Sox players
Brother Elephants players
Calgary Cannons players
Charlotte Knights players
Colorado Rockies players
Colorado Springs Sky Sox players
Gulf Coast Pirates players
Kinston Indians players
Major League Baseball pitchers
Norfolk Tides players
Pawtucket Red Sox players
People from Wabash, Indiana
Philadelphia Phillies players
Watertown Pirates players
Salem Buccaneers players
Sarasota Red Sox players
Sarasota White Sox players
South Bend White Sox players
Reading Phillies players
Reno Silver Sox players
Rochester Red Wings players
Watertown Indians players